Peter Hussing (15 May 1948 – 8 September 2012) was a West German heavyweight boxer. He won a bronze medal at the 1972 Olympics and placed fifth in 1976 and 1984; he missed the 1980 Moscow Games due to their boycott by West Germany.

Hussing won four medals at the European championships in 1969–1979, missing the 1977 tournament again due to a boycott. Domestically he won a record of 16 titles in 1969–83 and 1985. He held a degree in architecture from the University of Siegen, and in retirement worked as a construction manager in his hometown of Brachbach.

1972 Olympic results
Below is the record of Peter Hussing, a West German heavyweight boxer who competed at the 1972 Munich Olympics:

 Round of 16: bye
 Quarterfinal: defeated Oscar Ludena (Peru) by a first-round knockout
 Semifinal: lost to Teofilo Stevenson (Cuba) by a second-round technical knockout

References

1948 births
2012 deaths
People from Altenkirchen (district)
Olympic boxers of West Germany
Heavyweight boxers
Super-heavyweight boxers
Boxers at the 1972 Summer Olympics
Boxers at the 1976 Summer Olympics
Boxers at the 1984 Summer Olympics
Olympic bronze medalists for West Germany
Recipients of the Medal of the Order of Merit of the Federal Republic of Germany
Olympic medalists in boxing
Medalists at the 1972 Summer Olympics
German male boxers
AIBA World Boxing Championships medalists
Sportspeople from Rhineland-Palatinate